Hygrocybe batesii is an Australian mushroom of the waxcap genus Hygrocybe. Found growing on soil in moist shaded areas, it was described in 1997 by the mycologist Anthony M. Young.

References

External links

Fungi described in 1997
Fungi of Australia
batesii